Cyclosiella is a genus of moths in the family Erebidae. The genus was erected by George Hampson in 1900.

Species
Cyclosiella dulcicula (Swinhoe, 1890)
Cyclosiella dulciculoides Holloway, 2001
Cyclosiella spiralis (van Eecke, 1926)

References

Cisthenina
Moth genera